HP8 may refer to:

 HP8, the postcode for Chalfont St Giles
 Schreder Airmate HP-8, an American, high-wing single seat glider

See also
 HP (disambiguation)